The Kachin Hills are a heavily forested group of highlands in the extreme northeastern area of the Kachin State of Burma. It consists of a series of ranges running mostly in a N/S direction, including the Kumon Bum subrange of which the highest peak is Bumhpa Bum with an elevation of  one of the ultra prominent peaks of Southeast Asia.

Geography

Kachin people
The Kachin Hills are inhabited by the Kachin or Chingpaw, who are known on the Assam frontier as Singphos and on the Chinese frontier as Jingpos. Owing to the great number of tribes, sub-tribes and clans of the Kachins, the part of the Kachin hills which has been taken under administration in the Myitkyina and Bhamo districts was divided into 40   hill tracts (since reduced to five). Beyond these tracts, there are many Kachins in Katha, Mong Mit and the northern Shan States.  

There were 64,405 Kachins enumerated at the census of 1901. 

In the middle of the 19th century, the southern limit of the Kachins was 200 mi. farther north than it is now. Since then the ethnic group has been drifting steadily southward and eastward, a vast aggregate of small independent clans united by no common government, but all obeying a common impulse to move outwards from their original seats along the line of least resistance. Now the Kachins are on both sides of the border of upper Burma, and are a force to be reckoned with by frontier administrators.

British administration
According to the Kachin Hill Tribes Regulation of 1895, administrative responsibility was accepted by the British government on the left bank of the Irrawaddy for the country south of the Nmaikha, and on the right bank for the country south of a line drawn from the confluence of the Malikha and Nmaikha through the northern limit of the Laban district and including the jade mines. The tribes north of this line were told that if they abstained from raiding to the south of it they would not be interfered with. South of that line peace was to be enforced and a small tribute exacted, with a minimum of interference in-their private affairs.

On the British side of the border, the chief objects of Britain's colonial policy were the disarmament of the tribes and construction of frontier and internal roads. A light tribute was exacted. The Kachins have been the object of many police operations and two regular expeditions:

(I) Expedition of 1892-93 
Bhamo was occupied by the British on December 28, 1885, and almost immediately, trouble began. Constant punitive measures were carried on by the military police; but in December 1892, a police column proceeding to establish a post at Sima was heavily attacked, and simultaneously the town of Myitkyina was raided by Kachins. A force of 1,200 troops was sent to put down the rising. The enemy received their final blow at Palap, but not before three officers were killed, three wounded and 102 sepoys and followers killed and wounded.

(2) Expedition of 1895-96 
The continued misconduct of the Sana Kachins from beyond the administrative border rendered punitive measures necessary in the eyes of British colonialists. No retaliation had taken place since the attack on Myitkyina in December 1892. Now two columns were sent up, one of 250 rifles from Myitkyina, the other of 200 rifles from Mogaung, marching in December 1895. The resistance was insignificant, and the operations were completely successful. A strong force of military police was stationed at Myitkyina, with several outposts in the Kachin hills.

In 1910, the British occupied Hpimaw (Chinese characters: 片马, pinyin: Piànmǎ) in the Pianma Incident, as well as a part of what is now Northern Kachin state in 1926/7 and part of the Wa states in 1940. 

Burma relinquished the eastern villages of Gawlam (古浪), Hpimaw, and Kanfang (岗房) to the Chinese in 1960, ending the political boundary dispute. Although the area had been granted much autonomy under the 1947 constitution, the Burma government has since integrated it into the rest of the country.

See also
Jiangxinpo 
List of Ultras of Southeast Asia
Hukawng Valley

References

Sources

External links
What is behind clashes in Myanmar's Kachin hills?
Geology of an amber locality in the Hukawng Valley, Northern Myanmar
The Geology of Burma (Myanmar)

Hills of Myanmar